Stethoperma is a genus of longhorn beetles of the subfamily Lamiinae, containing the following species:

 Stethoperma batesi Lameere, 1884
 Stethoperma candezei Lameere, 1884
 Stethoperma duodilloni Gilmour, 1950
 Stethoperma flavovittata Breuning, 1940
 Stethoperma multivittis Bates, 1887
 Stethoperma obliquepicta Breuning, 1940
 Stethoperma zikani Melzer, 1923

References

Onciderini